Campbell Chapel African Methodist Episcopal Church or with AME abbreviation may refer to:

Campbell Chapel AME Church (Americus, Georgia), listed on the National Register of Historic Places in Sumter County, Georgia
Campbell Chapel AME Church (Atchison, Kansas)
Campbell Chapel African Methodist Episcopal Church (Glasgow, Missouri)
Campbell Chapel African Methodist Episcopal Church (Bluffton, South Carolina)
Campbell Chapel African Methodist Episcopal Church (Pulaski, Tennessee)